Chartiers Run is a tributary of Chartiers Creek in  Washington County, Pennsylvania in the United States. It was named after Peter Chartier, a trapper of French and Native American parentage who established a trading post at the mouth of Chartiers Creek in 1743.

Chartiers Run joins Chartiers Creek at the borough of Houston.

See also
List of rivers of Pennsylvania

References

External links
U.S. Geological Survey: PA stream gaging stations

Rivers of Pennsylvania
Tributaries of the Ohio River
Rivers of Washington County, Pennsylvania